Thomas Appleby (or Thomas de Appleby) was a Bishop of Carlisle. He was elected after 18 January 1363, and consecrated 18 June 1363. He died on 5 December 1395.

Citations

References
 
 

Bishops of Carlisle
1395 deaths
14th-century English Roman Catholic bishops
Year of birth unknown